Robert Reyburn Butler (September 24, 1881 – January 7, 1933) was an American lawyer, politician, and jurist who served as a U.S. Representative from Oregon from 1928 to 1933.. He also served in the Oregon State Senate and as a state circuit court judge in Oregon.

Early life
Butler was born in Butler, Tennessee, where he attended the public schools and then Holly Springs College. He was the son of Rebecca C. Grayson and William P. Butler, and a grandson of Congressman Roderick R. Butler. He graduated from Cumberland School of Law in Lebanon, Tennessee, in 1903. He was admitted to the bar and commenced practice in Mountain City, Tennessee. In 1906, Butler moved to Condon, Oregon, and resumed the practice of law. In 1911, Butler was married, with the marriage producing a single daughter.

Political career
In Oregon he served as mayor of Condon, before being appointed as circuit judge for the eleventh judicial district of Oregon and served from February 1909 until his retirement in January 1911. He held court for Sherman, Wheeler, and Gilliam counties in Eastern Oregon. In 1911, he moved to The Dalles, Oregon, and resumed the practice of law. He served as member of the Oregon State Senate twice, from 1913 to 1917, and again from 1925 to 1929.

In 1928, Nicholas J. Sinnott resigned his position representing Oregon's 2nd congressional district in the United States House of Representatives. Butler, a Republican, defeated Walter M. Pierce in a special election to complete the remaining two months of Sinnott's term, and on the same day, was elected to the full term for the next Congress. Butler was re-elected to a second term in 1930, defeating Democrat Robert E. Bradford.

In 1932, Butler faced his 1928 opponent Walter Pierce, but this time, Pierce won. Shortly after the election, Butler fell ill with pneumonia and on January 7, 1933, died of heart failure in a Washington, D.C. hospital. He was interred in the Odd Fellows Cemetery in The Dalles.

See also

 List of United States Congress members who died in office (1900–49)

References

External links

1881 births
1933 deaths
Republican Party Oregon state senators
People from The Dalles, Oregon
Oregon state court judges
Mayors of places in Oregon
People from Johnson County, Tennessee
Republican Party members of the United States House of Representatives from Oregon
20th-century American judges
People from Condon, Oregon
20th-century American politicians